Journal of the Renin-Angiotensin-Aldosterone System is a peer-reviewed academic journal that publishes papers in the field of Peripheral Vascular Disease. The journal's editors are Graham MacGregor and Peter Sever. It has been in publication since 2000 and is currently published by SAGE Publications.

Scope 
Journal of the Renin-Angiotensin-Aldosterone System is a resource for biomedical professionals, including basic scientists and clinicians, primarily with an active interest in the renin-angiotensin-aldosterone system in humans and other mammals. The journal publishes original research and reviews on the normal and abnormal function of the system. Journal of the Renin-Angiotensin-Aldosterone System also publishes research on other peptides, such as vasopressin, the natriuretic peptides and the kallikrein-kinin system.

Abstracting and indexing 
Journal of the Renin-Angiotensin-Aldosterone System is abstracted and indexed in, among other databases:  SCOPUS, and the Social Sciences Citation Index. According to the Journal Citation Reports, its 2013 impact factor is 2.271.

References

External links 
 

SAGE Publishing academic journals
English-language journals
Open access journals